Iraqi Post is a government-owned corporation that handles postal services in Iraq. Iraqi Post belongs to the Ministry of Communications.

See also
 List of postal codes in Iraq
 Postage stamps and postal history of Iraq

References

External links
 Iraqi Telecom & Post Company (ITPC)

Postal organizations
Pos
Telecommunications companies of Iraq
Postal system of Iraq
Communications in Iraq
Philately of Iraq
Companies based in Baghdad